Petch Sor Chitpattana, also known as Petch CP Freshmart and Petch CPF (born: November 20, 1993) is a Thai professional boxer in Bantamweight division. Before that, he involved in Muay Thai as Rambo Or Boonchuay (แรมโบ้ อ.บุญช่วย).

Petch debut in 2011, his current manager is Petchyindee Boxing Promotion's Wirat Wachirarattanawong.

On June 23, 2018, he has a program for challenge vacant WBC Bantamweight world title with fellow undefeated Frenchman Nordine Oubaali in Paris.  In this time, he has former WBC Flyweight world champion Chatchai Sasakul as a trainer. But this fight was postponed.  Ringstar, the organizer claim that because took place during the 2018 World Cup, so afraid that no one will be interested in watching.

Later, WBC assigned him to fight with Japanese Takuma Inoue, who is a younger brother of Naoya Inoue for vacant  WBC  interim Bantamweight title, both fight at the Ota City General Gymnasium, Tokyo on December 30, 2018, as a result, Petch was defeated for the first time with a unanimous scored 117–111 after 12 rounds.

Titles
World Boxing Council (WBC)
 WBC Youth Flyweight title (2011)
 WBC Youth Super flyweight title (2012)
 WBC Youth Bantamweight title (2013)

References

External links
 

Petch Sor Chitpattana
Living people
1993 births
Petch Sor Chitpattana
Flyweight boxers
Super-flyweight boxers
Bantamweight boxers